Red Faction: Battlegrounds is a vehicle simulation multi-directional shooter developed by Volition and published by THQ for the PlayStation Network and Xbox Live Arcade in 2011. It was released for the promotion of Red Faction: Armageddon.

Reception

The Xbox 360 version received "mixed" reviews, while the PlayStation 3 version received "generally unfavorable reviews", according to the review aggregation website Metacritic.

References

External links
 

2011 video games
Multidirectional shooters
Multiplayer and single-player video games
PlayStation 3 games
PlayStation Network games
Red Faction
THQ games
Vehicular combat games
Video game sequels
Video games developed in the United Kingdom
Video games developed in the United States
Video games set in the 22nd century
Video games set on Mars
Xbox 360 games
Xbox 360 Live Arcade games